Maria Inês Fonte (born 1 February 2002) is an inactive Portuguese tennis player.

She has career-high WTA rankings of 823 in singles, reached on 21 October 2021, and 670 in doubles, achieved on 28 September 2020.

Fonte made her Fed Cup debut for Portugal in 2019.

References

External links
 
 
 

2002 births
Living people
Portuguese female tennis players
21st-century Portuguese women
Competitors at the 2022 Mediterranean Games
Mediterranean Games competitors for Portugal